Creagh Glacier is a glacier,  long, flowing northeast from Creagh Icefall to the vicinity of Canoe Nunatak, Wilkniss Mountains, Victoria Land. It was named by the Advisory Committee on Antarctic Names in 1994 after Father Gerry Creagh (died 1994), a New Zealand citizen, who served as honorary U.S. Navy chaplain for over 25 summer seasons at the Chapel of the Snows, McMurdo Station. He was unofficially known as the "Chaplain of Antarctica."

References 

Glaciers of Victoria Land
Scott Coast